The Congolese Democratic Front (FDC) was a political party in Moyen-Congo. The party was founded by Emmanuel Dadet after he left the Congolese Progressive Party. The FDC failed to become a major force in Congolese politics. In 1956, Dadet joined  the Democratic Union for the Defense of African Interests (UDDIA).

FDC was also the name of an exile opposition group, that was founded by Aloîse Moudiléno-Massengo in the 1970s.

References

Defunct political parties in the Republic of the Congo